Lassi Forss (born 15 January 2002) is a Finnish professional footballer who plays as a right-back for Reipas.

References

2002 births
Living people
Finnish footballers
FC Lahti players
Reipas Lahti players
Kakkonen players
Veikkausliiga players
Association football defenders
Myllykosken Pallo −47 players
Sportspeople from Lahti